Steinen railway station or Steinen station could refer to:

 Steinen station (Germany), a railway station in Steinen, Germany
 Steinen railway station (Switzerland), a railway station in Steinen, Switzerland